Charles Alexandre (17 February 1797, Amiens – 6 June 1870, Paris) was a 19th-century French hellenist, philologist, general inspector of the Instruction publique and a member of the Institut de France.

He was a student at the École normale supérieure in 1814.

Works 
He is the author of many books, in particular an ancient greek-French dictionary published in 1858 as well as a coauthor of a French - ancient greek one published in 1861 and editor of an edition of the greek text, with a Latin translation of the Sibylline Oracles.

Honours 
 Commandeur de la Légion d'honneur.

References

External links 
 Notice sur la vie et les travaux de M. Charles Alexandre, membre de l'Académie 1871, sur le site de Persée
 Les oracles sibyllins : texte grec, traduction latine : édition de C. Alexandre, 1869
 Selected list of his publications on the Système Universitaire de Documentation catalog.

1797 births
1870 deaths
People from Amiens
French hellenists
French lexicographers
French philologists
École Normale Supérieure alumni
Members of the Académie des Inscriptions et Belles-Lettres
Commandeurs of the Légion d'honneur
19th-century lexicographers